Kinbrace  is a small village in Sutherland in the Highland council area of Scotland. The village has a station on the Far North Line (also named Kinbrace). Few people live in the village, with the population standing at 51 in the 2011 Census.

The village is represented in the House of Commons of the United Kingdom constituency of Caithness, Sutherland and Easter Ross, where it is represented by Jamie Stone of the Scottish Liberal Democrats. It is represented in the Scottish Parliament by Rob Gibson of the Scottish National Party.

Climate
Like most of the United Kingdom, Kinbrace experiences an oceanic climate (Cfb) with mild summers and cool winters. Nonetheless, it is one of the more frost prone low-lying locations in Scotland, with notable temperatures including a minimum of  during March 2001,  and a daytime maximum of  during November 1985,  when a temperature inversion persisted throughout the day. It is one of the few low-lying locations in Scotland which have recorded frost in each summer month.

Notable people
Angus Ross died in Kinbrace

See also
Auchentoul

References

Populated places in Sutherland